PA Hospital busway station is located in Brisbane, Australia serving the suburb of Buranda and Princess Alexandra Hospital from which its name is derived. It opened on 3 August 2009, as part of the Eastern Busway from UQ Lakes to Buranda.

It is served by seven routes all operated by Brisbane Transport.

References

External links
[ PA Hospital station] TransLink

Bus stations in Brisbane
Transport infrastructure completed in 2009